Karsholtia is a genus of moths of the family Tineidae. The genus contains the single species Karsholtia marianii. It is found in Norway, Sweden, Denmark, Germany, Austria, France and on Sicily.

The wingspan is 8–11 mm. Adults are on wing in July.

The larvae have been recorded feeding on the decaying trunks of Carpinus betulus.

References

Taxa described in 1986
Meessiinae
Moths of Europe
Monotypic moth genera